Bertie Arthur Sydney Spreadbury (30 April 1892 – 19 November 1956) was an English professional footballer who played as a centre forward in the Football League for Brentford.

Career 
Spreadbury began his career at Royal Ordnance Woolwich and joined Southern League First Division club Brentford in the second half of the 1919–20 season and scored four goals in 10 appearances. He was retained for the 1920–21 season, which was Brentford's first in the Football League. Behind Reginald Boyne in the pecking order, Spreadbury made just 12 appearances during the 1920–21 season and was released at the end of the campaign, after which he joined non-League club Woolwich.

Career statistics

References

English footballers
Footballers from Plumstead
Royal Ordnance Factories F.C. players
Brentford F.C. players
English Football League players
Association football forwards
Southern Football League players
1892 births
1956 deaths